The Mayerthorpe tragedy occurred on March 3, 2005, on the farm of James Roszko, approximately  north of Rochfort Bridge near the town of Mayerthorpe in the Canadian province of Alberta.

Roszko shot and killed four Royal Canadian Mounted Police (RCMP) constables: Anthony Gordon, Lionide "Leo" Johnston, Brock Myrol and Peter Schiemann. He then committed suicide. The attack occurred as the officers were executing a search warrant for stolen property and a marijuana-growing operation on the farm. Two individuals who were not present at the shooting, Shawn Hennessey and Dennis Cheeseman, pled guilty to manslaughter for assisting Roszko to return to his farm.

The incident was the worst one-day loss of life for the RCMP since five officers drowned on June 7, 1958, and the worst multiple-officer killing in contemporary Canadian history.

Incidents

Initial contact with Roszko 
On the afternoon of March 2, 2005, two civil bailiffs went to the farm owned by James Roszko to repossess a truck which Roszko had purchased, but on which he had not made any payments. They arrived around 3:00pm. There was a metal gate blocking the road into the farmyard. When Roszko saw the bailiffs, he released two large aggressive Rottweilers. The bailiffs decided they should call the RCMP. The officer who responded to the phone call warned them not to go onto the property until the RCMP arrived. Roszko had a criminal record with violent and sexual offences, and was subject to a firearms possession prohibition. He was known to the members of the Mayerthorpe RCMP Detachment.

Roszko swore at the bailiffs and drove off in a truck.  The bailiffs thought it may have been the truck they were to seize, but were not sure.

Shortly after Roszko drove off, three RCMP officers arrived, including Constable Peter Schiemann. The bailiffs had the legal authority to search the farm for the truck, since they were not sure if the truck Roszko was using was the truck that they had instructions to seize. Acting under that authority the bailiffs broke open the gate.  The Mounties confined the dogs in a shed.  The group then went to the quonset in the farmyard.  They found numerous vehicle parts, indicating a  stolen vehicle chop shop, and a marijuana grow-op.  The Mounties realised that they would need a search warrant before proceeding any further.  They left the quonset at approximately 4:15pm and called in the truck as stolen, warning that other officers should be on the lookout for Roszko.

Property search 

The senior officer in the group, Corporal James Martin, left to obtain a warrant, leaving two officers to maintain control of the farm.  Corporal Martin returned at 8:40pm with the warrant.  Given the expected magnitude of the search, the warrant was valid for twenty-four hours.  The Mounties first conducted a security search of the dwelling and the quonset, to ensure that Roszko was not present. While their search confirmed Roszko was not on the farm, the RCMP found a radio scanner tuned to the frequency of the Whitecourt RCMP detachment in Roszko's residence.  They also found lists containing intelligence on the local detachments at Mayerthorpe, Whitecourt,
Barrhead and Evansburg, including members' names, car numbers and cell phone numbers.  There was also a night vision scope and .308 and 9 mm caliber ammunition, which indicated Roszko was in breach of his firearms prohibition.

Having confirmed that Roszko was not present, the Mounties began the search of the quonset.  The initial focus was on the search and seizure of the marijuana plants and equipment, conducted by a special "Green Team" from the RCMP "K" Division in Edmonton.  According to documents obtained by the CBC's The Fifth Estate in a court case to have the search warrants made public, police seized seven growing marijuana plants, and 88 harvested plants from the residence, plus a further 192 growing marijuana plants along with growing equipment from the quonset. The marijuana search concluded around 3:00am on March 3, 2005.

All but two Mounties left at that point, with the expectation that an RCMP team which specialised in stolen vehicle searches would arrive in the morning.  Constables Anthony Gordon and Leo Johnston remained on the scene until the morning, with no signs of any trouble.  As a security measure during the night, the Mounties had parked several marked police vehicles prominently in the farmyard with their lights on.  They also left the vehicle doors and man-door of the quonset wide open, with bright halogen lights on inside.  The lights were also left on in the dwelling. The purpose was to make it clear that the Mounties were on the scene and investigating, and to deter unauthorised entry.

Roszko's return 

After he fled the farm, Roszko phoned Shawn Hennessey, who worked in Barrhead and who subsequently admitted that he was associated with Roszko in the grow-op.  Roszko wanted to hide his truck on Hennessey's property.  Hennessey refused, but he contacted his brother-in-law, Dennis Cheeseman, for help in dealing with Roszko.  Roszko went to Hennessey's farm. Hennessey and Cheeseman arrived there separately.

Roszko was armed with a Beretta hand-gun, and asked for a Winchester rifle that he knew that Hennessey had been given by Hennessey's grandfather.  Hennessey got the rifle, chambered in .300 Winchester Magnum, along with ammunition.  He wiped it down.  Cheeseman got a pillow case and some gloves.  He put on the gloves, then put the rifle in the pillowcase and gave it to Roszko.  It was clear to all there that Roszko was enraged at the police.  He said he was going to go back to his farm to burn down the quonset, with the evidence of the chop shop and grow op.  He had decided to hide the truck at his aunt's home, and asked Hennessey and Cheeseman to follow him there, then drive him to his own farm.  They agreed to do so. His aunt's house was 38.5 km from Roszko's own farm.

After parking his truck at his aunt's house, Roszko got into the car driven by Hennessey, who drove him back to the area of Roszko's farm.  On the way, Roszko continued to rant about the RCMP, saying he would get even with them. Cheeseman later said Roszko's ranting was "devil talk".

Roszko directed them to drive past the road leading to his own farm and go on to the next one. They could see the lights of the police cars at Roszko's farm.  Sometime between 1:00am and 3:00am on March 3, 2005, Hennessey and Cheeseman dropped Roszko off.  He pulled heavy socks over his boots, presumably to hide his tracks in the snow.  He grabbed the Hennessey rifle and set off towards his farm and the police.

As they were driving away, Cheeseman suggested to Hennessey that they call police. Hennessey disagreed, and no call was made.

Shooting 

On the morning of March 3, 2005, Constables Anthony Gordon and Leo Johnston were still providing scene security, pending the arrival of the RCMP Auto Theft investigators. In a telephone report at around 9:00am, Constable Johnston advised Corporal Martin that the night had been uneventful. Corporal Martin decided to send Constable Myrol to the scene to assist with the search by the Auto Theft investigators. Constable Schiemann was not assigned to work at the scene, but agreed to drop off Constable Myrol. They also agreed that they would pick up some meat and a veterinary sedative to feed and calm down the dogs, who had not been fed since they had been put in the shed the day before. The two drove to the Roszko farm, arriving sometime after 9:30am.

Just before 10:00am, Constable Garrett Hoogestraat and Constable Stephen Vigor of the RCMP Auto Theft investigation unit arrived. They saw the four Mayerthorpe Mounties at the shed, presumably feeding the meat and sedatives to the Rottweilers. As Hoogestraat and Vigor prepared for the search, the four Mayerthorpe Mounties went towards the quonset. The doors to the quonset were still open, as they had been all night.

Unknown to the Mounties, Roszko was inside the quonset. The subsequent Fatalities Inquiry could not determine when he had returned, but the judge conducting the inquiry concluded that it was unlikely Roszko had entered the quonset much before daylight as he was dressed to spend the night outdoors. He had probably approached the quonset hiding under a sheet which the Mounties later found in the quonset, along with a pillowcase and workgloves. The sheet would have masked him against the snow, and the socks over his boots would have muffled his steps.

The four Mayerthorpe Mounties entered the quonset. Outside the quonset, Constables Hoogestraat and  Vigor heard two loud bangs, followed by several other sounds which they recognized as gunfire. They also heard screaming from within the quonset. Constable Hoogestraat ran to the radio to report "officers down". Constable Vigor started to the entrance of the quonset, when Roszko came out. He had a hunting rifle slung on his back, a pistol in his belt and a G3 semi-automatic rifle in his hands. He was just casually walking out, then saw Constable Vigor and stopped, apparently surprised that there were more Mounties outside. He quickly recovered and fired two shots at Constable Vigor, who took shelter behind a police vehicle and returned fire with two shots from his sidearm. Both of his shots hit Roszko, who staggered back into the quonset.

Constable Hoogestraat was unable to make radio contact with the officers in the quonset. The RCMP Emergency Response Team was called by 10:13am and arrived by 11:52am from Edmonton, which is normally an hour away from Mayerthorpe. An armoured vehicle from the Canadian Forces Edmonton Garrison was called in, but subsequently stood down as not needed. The Emergency Response Team sent in a Remote Mobile Investigator, a robot with a video camera attached, and determined that all four officers and Roszko were dead.

The Fatalities Inquiry later determined that Roszko killed all four officers, who died almost instantly. Only Constable Johnston was able to return fire with one shot. Roszko then was wounded in the hand and in the thigh by the shots fired by Constable Vigor outside the quonset. The shot to his thigh fractured his femur. After he went back into the quonset, he turned his weapon on himself.

Victims 

The police officers killed in the Mayerthorpe tragedy are referred to as "The Fallen Four". Constables Johnston, Myrol and Schiemann were based out of the Mayerthorpe RCMP detachment while Constable Gordon was based out of Whitecourt RCMP detachment.

Anthony Gordon 

Constable Anthony Gordon, who was born in Edmonton, Alberta and raised in Red Deer, Alberta, became a police officer in October 2002. Constable Gordon was 28 at the time of his death.

Leo Johnston 

Constable Lionide "Leo" Johnston became a member of the RCMP in 2001. From Owl River, Alberta, he began his career in nearby Lac La Biche, Alberta before being transferred to Mayerthorpe. Constable Johnston was 32 at the time of his death. He was married to his wife, Kelly, on Nov. 13, 2004.

Brock Myrol 

Constable Brock Myrol, who was born in Outlook, Saskatchewan and raised in Red Deer.  He had just graduated from RCMP Academy, Depot Division and was an officer with the Mayerthorpe RCMP for less than three weeks at the time of the tragedy. Constable Myrol was 29 at the time of his death.

Peter Schiemann 
Constable Peter Schiemann (c.1980–2005) became a member of the RCMP in 2000. From Petrolia, Ontario and raised in Stony Plain, Alberta, he began his career in Mayerthorpe and was assigned to general policing and highway patrol. Constable Schiemann was 25 at the time of his death.

Post-shooting investigation

Roszko's movements 

The RCMP began an extensive investigation into the shooting, which lasted for two years. They spent more than $2-million investigating the tragedy, with over two hundred officers involved in the case between 2005 and 2007.  At the time charges were laid in 2007, there were still forty Mounties working on it.

In particular, the Mounties wanted to find out how Roszko returned to his farm.  His truck was found at his aunt's residence, 38.5 km from his own farm, suggesting he had received some assistance in returning.

Search of Roszko's property 

As part of the investigation, the RCMP conducted an extensive investigation of the Roszko property after the shootings, including manual searches and also searches by subsurface radar, x-ray, and airborne infrared methods.  A backhoe was also used.  These search techniques disproved local rumours that Roszko had major caches of drugs and weapons, or that there were tunnels which he had used to enter the quonset.

The search found a sheet, a pillowcase containing a pair of workgloves, a small bottle of water and a tin of bearspray in the northeast corner of the quonset.  The Fatalities Inquiry concluded that Roszko had likely concealed himself at that spot for some time, but had actually been in the southeast corner of the quonset when he fired the shots.  Subsequent DNA analysis found Hennessey's DNA on one of the workgloves.

Weapons 

The Mounties also found several weapons hidden in various spots in the quonset, including an empty gun bag that was the right size to hold the Heckler & Koch .308 semi-automatic rifle, and an empty Beretta pistol case.  These two cases, along with a .22 rifle and a shotgun in another case, were all hidden on a ledge and under the plywood roof, accessible only by ladder.  The Fatalities Inquiry surmised that the Heckler & Koch rifle had been hidden in this area and retrieved by Roszko after his return, since he did not have it when he was with Hennessey and Cheeseman.  The Fatalities Inquiry also concluded that the initial clearing search and then the Green Team search would have been unlikely to have found these weapons.  The Mounties also found three additional rifles, in a gun case hidden inside a seed-drill in the quonset:  a Husqvarna .308 rifle and two Lee Enfield .303 rifles.  There was also a rudimentary pipe bomb which would not have operated, a homemade silencing device, and various amounts of ammunition.

The Mounties investigated the sources for each of the guns.  The Heckler & Koch semi-automatic had been legally purchased by a person in Mayerthorpe in the early 1980s, who likely sold it to Rozsko.  After changes to firearms laws in 1995, the Heckler & Koch rifle was classified as a prohibited firearm.  The pistol was a Beretta 92 FS, which was a restricted weapon.  Roszko had purchased it in Utah in 1993 and apparently smuggled it into Canada.  The .22 rifle and shotgun were legally imported into Canada and were not restricted weapons.  The three rifles found hidden in the seed-drill all had been stolen from a location in Barrhead in 1997.  Roszko had never had a firearm registered to him.

The Mounties also investigated the Winchester hunting rifle.  It was registered to Shawn Hennessey's grandfather, John Hennessey. When asked how Roszko obtained the rifle, Shawn Hennessey said he had no idea, and that the rifle had been stolen four months before the shooting.  Hennessey subsequently admitted that he and his mother had alerted his grandfather that Roszko had the rifle.  John Hennessey admitted that he had told his daughter and grandson that they should all "story" to the police that the rifle had been stolen from the back of his welding truck.

Cell phone records 

A cell phone was found on Roszko's body.  The police obtained warrants to track his usage of the phone.  They found that he had begun to use the cell phone around the time he left his farm on March 2, 2005, continuing to do so until shortly before 1:00am on March 3, 2005.

Investigation into the cell phone usage showed that he had called his mother, who had called his aunt.  Interviews with his mother and aunt revealed that he had been seeking permission to hide his truck on his aunt's property.

The cell phone records also showed that Roszko phoned Hennessey's place of employment in Barrhead, and then made several calls to a bag phone (a robust incarnation of cell phone) which Hennessey had by virtue of his employment.  Roszko also made several calls to Hennessey's residence.  When information about the cell phone calls became public a year later, in 2006, Hennessey tearfully denied to a reporter for the Globe and Mail that he knew anything about the events, or why Roszko was calling him.

Undercover investigation 

Media accounts revealed that the RCMP conducted an extensive undercover investigation in the two years after the shootings. It was later reported that it involved an undercover RCMP female officer posing as a potential love interest for Cheeseman, leading him to other undercover officers posing as gang members in a "Mr. Big" operation.

Charges against Hennessey and Cheeseman

Murder charges 

On July 9, 2007, Hennessey (then 28 years old), and Cheeseman (then 23 years old), were charged as parties to the offences committed by Roszko. In 2006, Hennessey had denied any links to the crime. Although neither man was at the crime scene when the shootings took place, under Canadian criminal law, anyone who is a party to the murder of a police officer acting in the course of their duties can be charged with first degree murder under the Criminal Code.  In June 2008, they were committed to stand trial on the murder charges after a preliminary inquiry in the Provincial Court of Alberta.

Manslaughter sentences 

On January 19, 2009, Hennessey and Cheeseman pled guilty to four counts of the lesser charge of manslaughter.   On January 30, 2009, the Queen's Bench gave its decision on the sentences for the two men, which was based on an Agreed Statement of Facts, signed by Hennessey, Cheeseman, their lawyers and the Crown prosecutors.  The Crown was seeking sentences in the range of ten to fifteen years, while the defence counsel argued the sentences should be in the range of three to five years.

In his decision, the Queen's Bench judge rejected the defence position and accepted the Crown position.  He held that a fit sentence for Hennessey was fifteen years imprisonment, while a fit sentence for Cheeseman was twelve years. The Court gave them credit for their early guilty pleas and for time served awaiting trial, which reduced those initial estimates. He gave Hennesseey a sentence of 10 years plus 4 ½  months.  He gave Cheeseman a sentence of 7 years plus 2 ½ months in jail.

Appeals 

Both men appealed their sentences to the Alberta Court of Appeal.  On September 27, 2010, the Court unanimously dismissed Hennessey's appeal.  The Court dismissed Cheeseman's appeal by a 2-1 majority, with the dissenting judge preferring to give a lower sentence in light of Cheeseman's lesser participation in the offence. 

Hennessey and Cheeseman applied for leave to appeal to the Supreme Court of Canada in April and May 2011. The Supreme Court dismissed both applications on August 25, 2011.

Release 

Cheeseman was granted statutory release in 2013, after serving two-thirds of his sentence without incident. Hennessey was paroled in 2015.

Aftermath

Memorials 

A memorial service for the slain officers was held in Edmonton on March 10, 2005, and televised nationally on the CBC. Prime Minister Paul Martin and Governor General Adrienne Clarkson both spoke at the service. In addition to family and dignitaries, nearly 10,000 police officers from Canada and the United States were in attendance.

On May 19, 2005, Queen Elizabeth II attended a ceremony in honour of the slain officers at the RCMP Academy, Depot Division, in Regina, Saskatchewan.  She also met privately with relatives of the four slain Mounties in the RCMP Chapel at Depot Division.  At the time of the killings, she had sent a letter to the Lieutenant Governor of Alberta, expressing her shock and condolences.

The Fallen Four Memorial Society was founded to honour the slain policemen. The group initiated the building of the Fallen Four Memorial Park in Mayerthorpe, with a statue of each officer, which opened on July 4, 2008.

Also in 2008, a memorial in honour of the Fallen Four was unveiled in Whitecourt, Alberta, with a bench for each officer around a bronze statue of Constable Gordon's boots; Gordon was stationed at Whitecourt.

Media commentary 

The CBC program the fifth estate produced two documentaries about the killings.  The first one, entitled "A Hail of Bullets", aired on December 7, 2005.  The documentary suggested there were discrepancies in the RCMP account of the shooting. Following the 2009 guilty pleas and sentencing of Cheeseman and Hennessey, the fifth estate did a second documentary, entitled "Collateral Damage", which aired on February 4, 2009.  It included an interview with Hennessey. He now denied some of the material in the Agreed Statement of Facts which had been used in the sentencing hearing in Queen's Bench five days earlier.  In the interview, Hennessey said that he did not know about the police search of Roszko's property, and that he had no idea Roszko had intended to attack the Mounties.

Alberta Fatalities Inquiry 

The Minister of Justice convened a fatality inquiry into the deaths at Mayerthorpe under the Fatality Inquiries Act of Alberta, before Assistant Chief Judge Daniel R. Pahl. The inquiry began on January 11, 2011, in Stony Plain Provincial Court. The lengthy period between the killings and the inquiry was because the Fatality Inquiries Act provides that inquiries are to be stayed pending determination of criminal charges in relation to the deaths.

The inquiry produced a 26-page report, concluding that the deaths of the four officers were homicides and the death of Roszko was a suicide.  The report provides a detailed factual account of the killings, and also made eight recommendations to prevent a similar event from occurring in the future.

Upgrade to RCMP weapons 

On October 21, 2011, the Commissioner of the RCMP, William J. S. Elliott, announced that the RCMP officers would have a new weapon at their disposition, the C8 Rifle. One of the main conclusions from the Fatality Inquiry that led to this result was the fact that the officers who were involved in the events did not have the appropriate weapon to face someone with a semi-automatic rifle, as stated in the Fatalities Inquiry.

In popular culture 

 Corb Lund referenced this tragedy in a verse of the title track to his album Horse Soldier! Horse Soldier!
 KO referenced the tragedy in his song "The Ballad Of Jimmy Roscoe".
 On February 10, 2008, CTV aired a feature-length made-for-TV movie called Mayerthorpe.

See also 
David Wynn
Moncton shooting
 Spiritwood Incident

References

External links 

CBC News: Records of RCMP shooter paint chilling picture
CBC News: Suspect in RCMP killings had history of run-ins with police
CBC News: Indepth: RCMP
CBC the fifth estate documentary "A Hail of Bullets"
Fallen Four Society (memorial group)
 – docudrama about the tragedy

2005 in Alberta
Canadian police officers killed in the line of duty
Deaths by firearm in Alberta
Lac Ste. Anne County
Mass murder in 2005
Murder–suicides in Canada
Royal Canadian Mounted Police
Whitecourt
March 2005 events in Canada
2005 murders in Canada
Mass murder in Alberta
Massacres in Canada